The United Nations' International Law Commission  is composed of 34 members:

Current members
(for 2017–2021)

Past members

References
Present and former members of the International Law Commission (un.org)